Robert "Bob" Sinnaeve (born October 10, 1949) is a Canadian former professional darts player.

Early career
Sinnaeve took up darts in 1973 as an alternative to bowling, as he felt the darts circuit would give him more time to spend with his wife, Judy. He first appeared at the World Masters in 1979 and made his World Professional Darts Championship debut in 1982, but lost in the first round to Alan Evans.

World Championship record
Sinnaeve appeared at the World Championship on ten occasions, but managed to win only three matches in that time. He lost in the first round on his first four attempts (1982, 1984, 1985 and 1986), and finally won a match in 1987, producing a major upset by beating Dave Whitcombe, who reached the final in the previous year. His only other match wins came in 1988 against Horrie Seden, and in 1991 against Eric Burden. His last appearance at the World Championship came in 1992, when he lost 1–3 to Paul Lim.

Career record
Sinnaeve once managed to reach number four in the world rankings, and his best performance in a major tournament was reaching the final of the Winmau World Masters in 1986 – an event in which he competed each year between 1979 and 1991. Internationally, he was part of the Canadian WDF World Cup winning team of 1989 – the only time they have taken the team event title. Sinnaeve finished as Runner-Up in the 1986 Butlins Grand Masters, the 1987 World Cup Singles and the 1988 MFI World Matchplay, victim to Eric Bristow each time. He was also runner-up to John Lowe in the Canadian Open in 1986. He reached the semi-finals of this event in 1990 and further semi-final places in the 1987 Denmark Open and 1988 North American Open.

He received recognition as one of Canada's greatest ever players, winning a record five national titles (1979, 1983, 1986, 1987 & 1991) – a record which stood until John Part equalled it in 2007. He also won the Ontario Singles five times (1978, 1980, 1983, 1984 and 1987) and four All-Canada Cup singles titles (1985, 1986, 1987 and 1988). Sinnaeve was Canada's number one ranked player between 1981 and 1992.

He retired from competitive darts in 1992, and was inducted into the Canadian Darts Hall of Fame in 2002.

Recently, he has teamed up with American Larry Butler and is once again playing darts in North America.

World Championship results

BDO

 1982: Last 32: (lost to Alan Evans 1–2) (sets)
 1984: Last 32: (lost to Dave Whitcombe 0–2)
 1985: Last 32: (lost to Willy Logie 1–2)
 1986: Last 32: (lost to Alan Glazier 1–3)
 1987: Last 16: (lost to Alan Evans 0–3)
 1988: Last 16: (lost to Dennis Hickling 0–3)
 1989: Last 32: (lost to Dave Whitcombe 0–3)
 1990: Last 32: (lost to Leo Laurens 2–3)
 1991: Last 16: (lost to Dennis Priestley 0–3)
 1992: Last 32: (lost to Paul Lim 1–3)

Performance timeline

References

External links
Profile and Stats on Darts Database

Canadian darts players
1949 births
Living people
British Darts Organisation players
Professional Darts Corporation associate players